Lyme Regis was a parliamentary borough in Dorset, which elected two Members of Parliament (MPs) to the House of Commons from 1295 until 1832, and then one member from 1832 until 1868, when the borough was abolished.

Members of Parliament

1295–1629
 Constituency created (1295)

1640–1832

1832–1868

Election results

Elections in the 1830s

Elections in the 1840s

Pinney was unseated on petition on 31 May 1842, and Hussey was declared elected.

Elections in the 1850s

Elections in the 1860s

Notes and references 
Notes

References

Robert Beatson, A Chronological Register of Both Houses of Parliament (London: Longman, Hurst, Res & Orme, 1807) 
D Brunton & D H Pennington, Members of the Long Parliament (London: George Allen & Unwin, 1954)
Cobbett's Parliamentary history of England, from the Norman Conquest in 1066 to the year 1803 (London: Thomas Hansard, 1808) 
F W S Craig, British Parliamentary Election Results 1832–1885 (2nd edition, Aldershot: Parliamentary Research Services, 1989)
 Maija Jansson (ed.), Proceedings in Parliament, 1614 (House of Commons) (Philadelphia: American Philosophical Society, 1988)
 Lewis Namier & John Brooke, The History of Parliament: The House of Commons 1754–1790 (London: HMSO, 1964)* J E Neale, The Elizabethan House of Commons (London: Jonathan Cape, 1949)
 T. H. B. Oldfield, The Representative History of Great Britain and Ireland (London: Baldwin, Cradock & Joy, 1816)
 J Holladay Philbin, Parliamentary Representation 1832 – England and Wales (New Haven: Yale University Press, 1965)
 Henry Stooks Smith, The Parliaments of England from 1715 to 1847, Volume 1 (London: Simpkin, Marshall & Co, 1844)  
 	
 

Parliamentary constituencies in Dorset (historic)
Constituencies of the Parliament of the United Kingdom established in 1295
Constituencies of the Parliament of the United Kingdom disestablished in 1868
Lyme Regis